Alexandra McTavish is an Australian actress, writer and producer best known for Neighbours (2014), House Husbands (2012), Mako Mermaids (2013), and her self-penned comedy, Sport (2015). Born in Hong Kong to Australian parents, she is also co-founder and producer of the Anywhere Festival.

Personal life
McTavish grew up in Hong Kong but moved to Australia to attend the University of Queensland, graduating in 2000 with a Bachelor of Journalism in broadcasting. She subsequently relocated to the UK to study acting at Rose Bruford College. Growing up she also loved to write so she then pursued writing, and finally screenwriting at Australia's national screen arts and broadcast school, the Australian Film, Television and Radio School.

Film and television

Actress

Producer 
Anywhere Theatre Festival
Sport (2015)
3000 Hands (2013)

Writer 
Sport (2015)

References

 SMH - Sydney Morning Herald
 Brisbane News Brisbane's premier weekly lifestyle magazine
 The Courier Mail - an Australian newspaper

External links

Living people
Australian film actresses
Actresses from Sydney
Year of birth missing (living people)